In human genetics, a human mitochondrial DNA haplogroup is a haplogroup defined by differences in human mitochondrial DNA.  Haplogroups are used to represent the major branch points on the mitochondrial phylogenetic tree. Understanding the evolutionary path of the female lineage has helped population geneticists trace the matrilineal inheritance of modern humans back to human origins in Africa and the subsequent spread around the globe.

The letter names of the haplogroups (not just mitochondrial DNA haplogroups) run from A to Z. As haplogroups were named in the order of their discovery, the alphabetical ordering does not have any meaning in terms of actual genetic relationships.

The hypothetical woman at the root of all these groups (meaning just the mitochondrial DNA haplogroups) is the matrilineal most recent common ancestor (MRCA) for all currently living humans. She is commonly called Mitochondrial Eve.

The rate at which mitochondrial DNA mutates is known as the mitochondrial molecular clock. It is an area of ongoing research with one study reporting one mutation per 8000 years.

Phylogeny 

This phylogenetic tree is based Van Oven (2009). In June 2022, an alternative phylogeny for haplogroup L was suggested

 L (Mitochondrial Eve)
 L0
 L1-6
 L1
 L2-6
 L5
 L2'3'4'6
 L2
 L3'4'6
 L6
 L3'4
 L4
 L3
 N
 N1: I
 N2: W
 N9: Y
 A
 S
 X
 R
 R0 (FMKA pre-HV)
 HV: (H, V)
 pre-JT or R2'JT
 JT: (J, T)
 R9: F
 R11'B: B
 P
 U (formerly UK)
 U8: K
 O
 M
 M9: E
 M12'G: G
 M29'Q: Q
 D
 M8: CZ (C, Z)

Major mtDNA Haplogroups

Macro-haplogroup L 
Macro-haplogroup L is the most basal of human mtDNA haplogroups, from which all other haplogroups descend (specifically, from haplogroup L3). It is found mostly in Africa. 
 Haplogroup L0
 L1-7
 Haplogroup L1
 L2-7
 L3'4'6
 Haplogroup L2
 L346
 L34
 Haplogroup L3
 Haplogroup L4
 Haplogroup L6
 L5'7
 Haplogroup L5
 Haplogroup L7

Macro-haplogroup M 
Macro-haplogroup M is found mostly in Asia and the Americas. Its descendants are haplogroup M, haplogroup C, haplogroup Z, haplogroup D, haplogroup E, haplogroup G and haplogroup Q.

Macro-haplogroup N 
Macro-haplogroup N is found mostly in Australia, the Americas and parts of Asia. Its descendants are haplogroup N, haplogroup O, haplogroup A, haplogroup S, haplogroup I, haplogroup W, haplogroup X and haplogroup Y, as well as macro-haplogroup R.

Macro-haplogroup R 
Macro-haplogroup R is found mostly in Europe, Northern Africa, the Pacific and parts of Asia and the Americas. Its descendants are haplogroup R, haplogroup B, haplogroup F, haplogroup H, haplogroup V, haplogroup J, haplogroup T, haplogroup U and haplogroup K

Chronology

Geographical distribution
A 2004 paper suggested that the haplogroups most common in modern West Asian, North African and European populations were:
H, J, K, N1, T, U4, U5, V, X and W.

African haplogroups:  L0, L1, L2, L3, L4, L5, L6, T, U5a

Australian haplogroups: M42a, M42c, M14, M15, Q, S, O, N, P. (Refs 1, 2, 3, 4, 5, 6)

Brian Sykes' book The Seven Daughters of Eve listed the seven haplogroups found as Europe as: H, J, K, T, U and X. 

Asian haplogroups: F, C, W, M, D, N, K, U, T, A, B, C, Z, U many number variants to each section

See also
 Human mitochondrial genetics
 Genetic genealogy
 Matrilineality
 Human Y-chromosome DNA haplogroups
 Population genetics

References

External links

 Mitochondrial phylogenetic trees
 Mannis van Oven's PhyloTree.org
 PhyloD3 – D3.js-based phylogenetic tree based on PhyloTree
 Mitochondrial haplogroup skeleton
 Vincent Macaulay's Mitochondrial haplogroup motifs
 List of mtDNA haplogroup projects
 MitoTool: a web server for the analysis and retrieval of human mitochondrial DNA sequence variations
 HaploGrep: mtDNA haplogroup determination based on PhyloTree.org
 HaploFind – fast automatic haplogroup assignment pipeline for human mitochondrial DNA 

Genetics-related lists